Marlon Ramirez (born 17 April 1994 in Honduras) is a Honduran footballer. Besides Honduras, he has played in Egypt and the United States.

Career

Ramirez started his senior career with C.D.S. Vida. In 2013, he signed for Whitecaps 2 in the American USL Championship, where he made five league appearances and scored zero goals. After that, he played for Charleston Battery, Motagua, C.D. Victoria, Juticalpa, ENPPI SC, C.D. Honduras Progreso, C.D. Marathón, and Lobos UPNFM.

On 14 January 2022, Machuca signed with FC Tulsa in the USL Championship. He was released by Tulsa following the 2022 season.

References

External links 
 Marlon Ramírez: "They have treated me well, Mario left a good image" 
 Marlon Ramírez: "I am going with the hope of doing things well" 
 Marlon Ramírez: "I am living my best moment..."
 Marlon Ramírez on Vargas: "I hope the teacher does not marginalize me"

1994 births
Living people
Honduran footballers
C.D. Honduras Progreso players
C.D. Marathón players
Juticalpa F.C. players
C.D.S. Vida players
F.C. Motagua players
Charleston Battery players
FC Tulsa players
Association football forwards
Association football midfielders
Honduran expatriate footballers
Honduran expatriate sportspeople in Canada
Honduran expatriate sportspeople in the United States
Expatriate footballers in Egypt
Expatriate soccer players in the United States
Expatriate soccer players in Canada